Gustav Casmir (5 November 1874 – 2 October 1910) was a German fencer. He won two gold and two silver medals at the 1906 Intercalated Games.

References

1874 births
1910 deaths
German male fencers
Olympic fencers of Germany
Olympic gold medalists for Germany
Olympic silver medalists for Germany
Olympic medalists in fencing
Medalists at the 1906 Intercalated Games
Fencers at the 1904 Summer Olympics
Fencers at the 1906 Intercalated Games
Fencers from Berlin
20th-century German people